High Brooms is a suburb of Royal Tunbridge Wells in Kent, England.  Its railway station is High Brooms railway station. It is connected by train to London and Hastings. It is in the civil parish of Southborough.

Between 1885 and 1968, the High Brooms Brick & Tile Company excavated clay in the area.

See also
Tunbridge Wells

References

External links

Royal Tunbridge Wells